Vigo Ria and  is an estuary in Galicia, Spain. It is the southernmost ria of the Rías Baixas. Its western entrance is protected by the Cies Islands, which are part of the National Park of the Atlantic Islands, within the islands of Toralla and San Simon. Its borders the north with Morrazo Peninsula. In the extreme south lies the Bay of Baiona. Its easy access, deep draft and calm waters make the Vigo estuary an ideal retreat for sailing and water sports.

From the environmental point of view, it is a bay with a biologically richness because of its crop water currents and deep cold waters from the north, carrying large quantities of nutrients. Historically, the Vigo estuary area has been good for fishing and shell fishing, although current conditions are not ideal due to high human and industrial pressure on the coastal waterfront.

On its banks stands the city of Vigo. The municipalities of Baiona, Nigrán, Redondela, Soutomaior, Vilaboa, Moaña and Cangas do Morrazo are also situated here. It has a total population of about 420,000 inhabitants.

The Battle of Rande was fought here on October 23, 1702, more precisely at the end of the estuary, in the Ensenada de San Simón.

Tourist activities

 Water sports at the marinas in Baiona, Chapela, Moana, Cangas and Vigo.
 Two golf courses of eighteen holes and one of nine nearby.
 Parador "Conde de Gondomar" in Baiona: Located inside a medieval fortress, has a natural setting and convenient facilities.
 Pazo los Escudos in Vigo: converted Galician manor house that has walled gardens spread across the largest collection of heraldic Galician carvings.
 Pazo de Castrelos: manor house in Vigo.
Castro de Vigo.

See also
 Rande Bridge

External links
 Turismo Rías Baixas

References 

Vigo
Estuaries of Spain
Landforms of Galicia (Spain)